Kimonas Deligiannis (born 1914, date of death unknown) was a Greek footballer. He played in three matches for the Greece national football team from 1936 to 1938. He was also part of Greece's team for their qualification matches for the 1938 FIFA World Cup.

References

External links
 

1914 births
Year of death missing
Greek footballers
Greece international footballers
Place of birth missing
Association football midfielders